Aistė Gedvilienė (born September 17, 1985, in Kaunas) is a Lithuanian politician, a Member of the Seimas for Fabijoniškės constituency since 13 November 2020. Also she is a former Executive Secretary of Homeland Union - Lithuanian Christian Democrats.

Career
In 200,8 Gedvilienė graduated from Mykolas Romeris University. She holds a bachelor's degree in law.

From 2008 to 2009, she was Kaunas District Municipality Administration Urban Planning Division Chief Specialist. From 2009 to 2010, Gedvilienė took place in Kaunas District Municipality Administration as Legal Division Chief Specialist. From 2010 to 2012, she was assistant to the Ministry of Social Security and Labour. She was Deputy Executive Secretary of the Homeland Union from 2013 to 2014, and in 2017-2019 Executive Secretary. From 2014 to 2015, Gedvilienė was an adviser to Gabrielius Landsbergis when he was MEP. From 7 July 2019 she replaced Rasa Juknevičienė as Member of the Seimas.

References 

Members of the Seimas
21st-century Lithuanian politicians
Women members of the Seimas

1985 births
Living people
Homeland Union politicians
Mykolas Romeris University alumni
Kaunas University of Technology alumni
21st-century Lithuanian women politicians